"Enfances" is an essay written  by French Nobel laureate J. M. G. Le Clézio for a book of the same name which was co-written by Brigitte Fossey and set to  photographs by Christophe Kuhn.

Purpose
The essay in "Enfances" was written by Le Clézio to contribute to this  book of photographs.

French
It was originally published in French in 2003 and there is no English translation published to date.

"Enfances"

as published by "Enfants réfugiés du monde" 
Photographs were taken by  Christophe Kuhn .
48 pages."Enfances" was co-written by Brigitte Fossey.

Photography and Neorealism 
Le Clézio has written about the impact of visual representation in media such as cinema and photography. Le Clézio has written texts for numerous books of photographs as well as "Enfances".
In the Eye of the Sun:Mexican Fiestas
Les Prophéties du Chilam Balam
Le Rêve mexicain ou la pensée interrompue
Relation de Michoacan (1984: Accounts of the Michoalan)

Publication history
1998, France, Enfants réfugiés du monde

References

1998 essays
Essays by J. M. G. Le Clézio
Works by J. M. G. Le Clézio